The Grenzchopf (2,193 m) is a mountain of the Appenzell Alps, overlooking the Schwägalp Pass on the border between the Swiss cantons of Appenzell Ausserrhoden and St. Gallen.

Located 2 kilometres west of the Säntis, the Grenzchopf is one of the highest summits of the canton of Appenzell Ausserrhoden. It is also its southernmost point.

References

External links
Grenzchopf on Hikr
 Spherical panorama of Grenzchopf

Mountains of the Alps
Mountains of Switzerland
Mountains of Appenzell Ausserrhoden
Mountains of the canton of St. Gallen
Appenzell Alps
Two-thousanders of Switzerland